Tom Jones is a 1963 British comedy film, an adaptation of Henry Fielding's classic 1749 novel The History of Tom Jones, a Foundling, starring Albert Finney as the title hero. It was one of the most critically acclaimed and popular comedies of its time, and won four Academy Awards, including Best Picture. The film was produced and directed by Tony Richardson and the screenplay was adapted by playwright John Osborne.

A period piece set in 18th-century Somerset, Gloucestershire and London, Tom Jones was a success both critically and at the box office. At the 36th Academy Awards, it was nominated for ten Oscars, winning four: Best Picture, Best Director for Richardson, Best Adapted Screenplay and Best Original Score. It also won two Golden Globe Awards, including Best Motion Picture – Musical or Comedy, and three BAFTA Awards, including Best Film and Best British Film.

In 1999, the British Film Institute ranked it as the 51st greatest British film of the 20th century.

Plot

Squire Allworthy returns to his estate, and discovers a baby in his bed. Thinking that one of his maids, Jenny Jones, and his barber, Mr. Partridge, conceived the illegitimate baby out of lust, the squire banishes them. He names the infant Tom Jones and chooses to raise him as his own son; Tom grows up loving him like a father.

Tom becomes a lively young man whose good looks and kind heart make him popular with women. He truly loves only Sophie, daughter of a neighbour, who returns his love. Sophie, too, must hide her feelings while her aunt and father, Squire Western, try to coerce her to marry someone they think more suitable, the nephew of Squire Allworthy.

The young man is Mr. Blifil, the son of Squire Allworthy's, sister Bridget. When Bridget dies unexpectedly, Blifil intercepts a letter, which his mother intended for his uncle's eyes only. But after his mother's funeral, Blifil and his two tutors, Mr. Thwackum and Mr. Square (who had also tutored Tom), join forces to convince the squire that Tom is a villain. Allworthy gives Tom a substantial cash legacy and sends him out into the world to seek his fortune.

Tom is robbed of his fortune, but soon meets his father Mr. Partridge who becomes his man servant. Tom rescues a Mrs. Waters/Fitzpatrick from a British soldier, but ends up in a duel and is later jailed and about to be hanged for murder before it is discovered that the letter that Bridget had written to Squire Allworthy confessed that she is Tom's mother. It is discovered also that Tom had not murdered Mr. Fitzpatrick in the duel.

They are able to reach to jail in time to save Tom from hanging.  Tom and Sophie are able to marry with everyone's blessing.

Cast

Production

Development
While the British production company Bryanston Films was hesitating over whether to make the film in colour, it went bankrupt. United Artists stepped in to finance the film and make it a colour production.

Overall the production faced challenges of disasters, near-disasters and squabbles caused by films being shot on location in the spotty English weather. The film has an unusual comic style: The opening sequence has subtitles and brisk action in the manner of a silent film. Later in the film, characters sometimes break the fourth wall, often by looking directly into the camera and addressing the audience. In one scene the character of Tom Jones suddenly appears to notice the camera and covers the lens with his hat. Another unusual feature is an unseen narrator, voiced by Micheál Mac Liammóir. His mock-serious commentaries between certain scenes deplore the action of several characters as well as the weaknesses in human character, and he provides a poetic denouement for the film.

Despite its success, director Tony Richardson said that he was dissatisfied with the final product. In his autobiography, Richardson wrote that he "felt the movie to be incomplete and botched in much of its execution. I am not knocking that kind of success – everyone should have it – but whenever someone gushes to me about Tom Jones, I always cringe a little inside."

Writing
John Osborne, in adapting the screenplay from Henry Fielding's novel The History of Tom Jones, a Foundling (1749), truncated and removed notable episodes and characters from the book. 
He ends the film with the narrator's quoting from a portion of John Dryden's poetic translation of Horace's Ode: To Maecenas:  
"Happy the man, and happy he alone,He who can call today his own: He who, secure within, can say, Tomorrow do thy worst, for I have lived today."

Filming
Castle Street in Bridgwater, Somerset was used as a location in several scenes. Cinematographer Walter Lassally has said that he thought the location unit got on very well together under the circumstances and that the experience was satisfying. He thought Richardson rather lost his way in post-production, endlessly fixing what was not really broken.

Release
The film was reissued in 1989 by The Samuel Goldwyn Company. For this release, Richardson trimmed the film by seven minutes. It is available through the Criterion Collection, paired with the original version.

Reception

Critical reception
Time magazine's review stated "The film is a way-out, walleyed, wonderful exercise in cinema. It is also a social satire written in blood with a broadaxe. It is bawdy as the British were bawdy when a wench had to wear five petticoats to barricade her virtue".

Rich Gold of Variety wrote "Though Tom Jones is a period piece and very different it has the same lustiness and boisterous content with which to project the star. It should breeze its way cheerfully through the box office figures. It has sex, Eastmancolor, some prime performers and plenty of action. Tony Richardson has directed John Osborne's screenplay with verve, though, occasionally, he falls back on camera tricks and editing which are disconcerting".

On Rotten Tomatoes, the film has an approval rating of 80% based on retrospective reviews from 41 critics, with an average rating of 7.5/10. The site's consensus states: "A frantic, irreverent adaptation of the novel, bolstered by Albert Finney's courageous performance and arresting visuals." On Metacritic, it has a score of 77 out of 100, based on reviews from 15 critics, indicating "generally favorable reviews. Ray Austin, stunt Coordinator and Master of horse excelled, he also doubled Albert Finney and others throughout the film and played Ruffian number one uncredited".

Box office
The film was financially successful on its initial release in 1963. It came third for the year in British box-office receipts, and was the fourth most popular in the United States. Produced on a budget of $1 million, it earned over $17 million in theater rentals from the United States and Canada, and another $4 million in markets other than the UK and U.S. Finney received 10% of the film's earnings.

Accolades

Ilya Lopert accepted the Academy Award for Best Picture on behalf of the producers. After his death, the Oscar was given by his estate to Albert Finney.

Tom Jones is the only film in the history of the Academy Awards in which three actresses were nominated for the Academy Award for Best Supporting Actress. Margaret Rutherford won the category for her role in The V.I.P.s.

The film's five acting nominations and no wins matched the record set for nominations by Peyton Place in 1957. It was the last film to match this record.

See also
 BFI Top 100 British films

Notes

References

External links
 
 
 
 "Tom Jones: Tomorrow Do Thy Worst", essay by Neil Sinyard at the Criterion Collection

1963 films
1960s adventure comedy films
1960s historical comedy films
Best Musical or Comedy Picture Golden Globe winners
Films that won the Best Original Score Academy Award
Best Picture Academy Award winners
British adventure comedy films
British historical films
Films based on British novels
Films based on works by Henry Fielding
Films directed by Tony Richardson
Films scored by John Addison
Films set in London
Films set in the 18th century
Films whose director won the Best Directing Academy Award
Films whose writer won the Best Adapted Screenplay Academy Award
United Artists films
British drama films
Best Film BAFTA Award winners
Best British Film BAFTA Award winners
1963 comedy films
1960s English-language films
1960s British films